Anton Nikolayevich Rogochiy (born 23 January 1982) is a Russian professional football coach and a former player. He is an assistant coach with the Under-20 squad of FC Rostov.

Playing career
He made his debut in the Russian Premier League in 1999 for FC Rostselmash Rostov-on-Don. He played 4 games in UEFA Intertoto Cup 1999 and UEFA Intertoto Cup 2000 for FC Rostselmash Rostov-on-Don.

Honours
 Russian Cup finalist: 2003.

References

External links
 

1982 births
Sportspeople from Rostov-on-Don
Living people
Russian footballers
Russia under-21 international footballers
Association football defenders
Russian Premier League players
FC Baltika Kaliningrad players
FC Rostov players
FC Kuban Krasnodar players
FC Khimki players
PFC Spartak Nalchik players
FC Vityaz Podolsk players
FC Sibir Novosibirsk players
FC Chayka Peschanokopskoye players